Lasse Juliussen (born 14 January 1986) is a Norwegian politician for the Labour Party.

He has served as an elected member of Nord-Odal municipal council and Hedmark county council. In 2012 he entered the county cabinet in Hedmark as the youngest ever county cabinet member in Norway. In the 2009 and 2013 elections he was elected as a deputy representative to the Parliament of Norway from Hedmark.

References

1986 births
Living people
People from Nord-Odal
Labour Party (Norway) politicians
Hedmark politicians
Deputy members of the Storting
21st-century Norwegian politicians